In Slovakia, the standard time is Central European Time (UTC+01:00). Daylight saving time is observed from the last Sunday in March (02:00 CET) to the last Sunday in October (03:00 CEST). This is shared with several other EU member states.

IANA time zone database 
The IANA time zone database gives Slovakia Europe/Bratislava.

See also 
Time in Europe
List of time zones by country
List of time zones by UTC offset

References

External links 
Current time in Slovakia at Time.is
Time in Slovakia at TimeAndDate.com
Time in Slovakia at Lonely Planet